Maximiliano Pellegrino (born January 26, 1980 in Leones, Córdoba Province) is an Argentine retired footballer, who played as centre back.

Career
Before his move to Italy for the start of the 2007–08 season, he had spent his whole professional career for Buenos Aires club Vélez Sarsfield. On 24 June 2010 Atalanta B.C. loaned the defender to A.C. Cesena along with Fabio Caserta, as part of the deal that sign Ezequiel Schelotto outright.

After the season-long on loan to Cesena, his contract with Atalanta finished, and he was moved to Colón de Santa Fe on a free transfer.

Personal life
Maximiliano is the younger brother of former Argentina defender Mauricio Pellegrino.

Honours 
Vélez Sársfield
 Primera División Argentina (1): 2005 Clausura

References

External links 
  Atalanta B.C. Official Player Profile
 
 

1980 births
Living people
Sportspeople from Córdoba Province, Argentina
Argentine footballers
Argentine expatriate footballers
Club Atlético Vélez Sarsfield footballers
Atalanta B.C. players
A.C. Cesena players
Club Atlético Colón footballers
All Boys footballers
Argentine Primera División players
Primera Nacional players
Torneo Argentino B players
Serie A players
Expatriate footballers in Italy
Argentine expatriate sportspeople in Italy
Association football defenders